George Baillie-Hamilton, 10th Earl of Haddington DL (14 April 1802 – 25 June 1870), known as George Baillie until 1858, was a Scottish Conservative politician.

Life
Haddington was the son of George Baillie and his wife Mary (née Pringle). Charles Baillie, Lord Jerviswoode, was his younger brother.

He succeeded his second cousin Thomas Hamilton, 9th Earl of Haddington in the earldom in 1858, and in 1859 he assumed by Royal licence the additional surname of Hamilton.

The latter year he was also elected a Scottish Representative Peer and took his seat on the Conservative benches in the House of Lords. He served under the Earl of Derby and Benjamin Disraeli as a Lord-in-waiting (government whip in the House of Lords) from 1867 to 1868. Between 1867 and 1868 he was also Lord High Commissioner to the General Assembly of the Church of Scotland.

Lord Haddington died at Tyninghame House on 25 June 1870, aged 68.

Marriage and Issue
Lord Haddington married Georgina Markham (d. 26 February 1873), daughter of the Venerable Robert Markham, Archdeacon of York, on 16 December 1824 and had issue:
George Baillie-Hamilton-Arden, 11th Earl of Haddington
Hon Robert Baillie-Hamilton (1828-1891) MP for Berwickshire
Hon. Clifton Baillie-Hamilton (1831-1857)
Cdr. the Hon. Henry Baillie-Hamilton
Hon. Percy Baillie-Hamilton died in infancy
Rev the Hon. Arthur Baillie-Hamilton, vicar of Badley
Lady Mary Baillie-Hamilton
Lady Frances Baillie-Hamilton
Lady Georgina Baillie-Hamilton

Notes

References
  Anderson, J., Historical and Genealogical Memoirs of the House of Hamilton; with genealogical memoirs of the several branches of the family, Edinburgh, 1825.
  Balfour Paul, Sir J., Scots Peerage IX vols. Edinburgh, 1904.
 Kidd, Charles & Williamson, David (editors). Debrett's Peerage and Baronetage (1990 edition). New York: St Martin's Press, 1990, 
 

1802 births
1870 deaths
10
Lords High Commissioner to the General Assembly of the Church of Scotland
Scottish representative peers
Place of birth missing
George